The Aero was the creation of Narazo Shamazu, who had built motorcycles under the NS name prior to World War I. The Aero was manufactured between 1925 and 1927, and featured 250cc and 633cc single-cylinder engines.

References

Motorcycle manufacturers of Japan